Adolphus I, Prince of Schaumburg-Lippe (Adolf Georg; 1 August 1817 – 8 May 1893) was a ruler of the Principality of Schaumburg-Lippe.

Biography
He was born in Bückeburg to Georg Wilhelm, Prince of Schaumburg-Lippe and Princess Ida of Waldeck and Pyrmont (1796–1869).

He succeeded as Prince of Schaumburg-Lippe following the death of his father, Prince Georg Wilhelm on 21 November 1860. In 1866, Schaumburg-Lippe signed a military treaty with Prussia, and in 1867 entered a military union, where Schaumburgers served in the Prussian military. Also in 1867, Schaumburg-Lippe became a member of the North German Confederation, and later in 1871 became a member state of the German Empire on its founding. He died at Bückeburg and was succeeded by his son Georg.

Marriage and children

On 25 October 1844 at Arolsen, Adolf was married to his cousin, Princess Hermine of Waldeck and Pyrmont (1827–1910), a daughter of George II, Prince of Waldeck and Pyrmont. His mother was a sister of her father. The couple had eight children:

 Princess Hermine of Schaumburg-Lippe (1845–1930); married Duke Maximilian of Württemberg, only son of Duke Paul Wilhelm of Württemberg.
 Prince Georg of Schaumburg-Lippe (1846–1911); succeeded his father as Prince of Schaumburg-Lippe; married Princess Marie Anne of Saxe-Altenburg.
 Prince Hermann of Schaumburg-Lippe (1848–1928).
 Princess Emma of Schaumburg-Lippe (1850–1855).
 Princess Ida of Schaumburg-Lippe (1852–1891); married Heinrich XXII, Prince Reuss of Greiz.
 Prince Otto Heinrich of Schaumburg-Lippe (1854–1935); married Anna von Köppen, Countess von Hagenburg.
 Prince Adolf of Schaumburg-Lippe (1859–1917); married Princess Viktoria of Prussia, daughter of Frederick III, German Emperor and Victoria, Princess Royal, eldest daughter of Queen Victoria.
 Princess Emma of Schaumburg-Lippe (1865–1868).

Orders and decorations
  Kingdom of Prussia:
 Knight of the Order of the Red Eagle, 1st Class, 18 January 1850
 Knight of the Order of the Black Eagle, 18 January 1872
 :
 Knight of the House Order of Fidelity, 1885
 Knight of the Order of Berthold the First, 1885	
   Austria-Hungary: Grand Cross of the Royal Hungarian Order of St. Stephen, 1885
 : Honorary Knight Grand Cross of the Most Honourable Order of the Bath (civil division), 16 May 1892

Ancestry

References

External links
Schaumburg-Lippe

1817 births
1893 deaths
People from Bückeburg
House of Lippe
People from Schaumburg-Lippe
Princes of Schaumburg-Lippe
Grand Crosses of the Order of Saint Stephen of Hungary
Honorary Knights Grand Cross of the Order of the Bath